Ancylobothrys petersiana grows as a climbing shrub up to  tall. Its fragrant flowers feature a creamy or white corolla. Vernacular names include "climbing wild apricot". Habitat is woodland and rocky hillsides. A. petersiana is found in the Democratic Republic of Congo, Burundi, Somalia, Kenya, Tanzania, Malawi, Mozambique, Zimbabwe, South Africa, the Comoros and Madagascar.

The fruit contains edible pulp with a sour taste around the many seeds. It can be eaten out of hand or prepared into a sweetened juice, and it is sold in local markets for this purpose.

References

Geoxyles
petersiana
Flora of Africa
Flora of the Comoros
Flora of Madagascar
Plants described in 1861
Fruits originating in Africa